Artyom Sergeyevich Maksimenko (born 27 May 1998) is a Russian football player. He plays for FC Rotor Volgograd on loan from FC Ural Yekaterinburg as a left winger or centre-forward.

Club career
He made his debut in the Russian Football National League for FC Nizhny Novgorod on 7 July 2019 in a game against FC Tom Tomsk.

On 15 January 2021, he joined Russian Premier League club FC Ural Yekaterinburg. He made his RPL debut for Ural on 28 February 2021 in a game against FC Krasnodar. On 19 January 2022, he joined FC Baltika Kaliningrad on loan until the end of the 2021–22 season. On 2 July 2022, Maksimenko was loaned to FC Rotor Volgograd.

Career statistics

References

External links
 Profile by Russian Football National League
 
 
 

1998 births
Sportspeople from Tolyatti
Living people
Russian people of Ukrainian descent
Russian footballers
Russia youth international footballers
Association football midfielders
Association football forwards
FC Rostov players
FC Arsenal Tula players
FC Nizhny Novgorod (2015) players
FC Zenit-2 Saint Petersburg players
FC Veles Moscow players
FC Ural Yekaterinburg players
FC Baltika Kaliningrad players
FC Rotor Volgograd players
Russian Premier League players
Russian First League players
Russian Second League players